Skinning is the act of skin removal, usually from a dead animal.

Skinning may also refer to:
 Skinning (film), a 2010 Serbian film
 The process of applying a computer skin that changes the look, feel, and navigation interface of application software
 In skeletal animation, defining an influence that bones have over the mesh
 Uphill skiing using ski skins

See also
 Skin (disambiguation)